Agave scabra (synonym Manfreda scabra), also known as rough leaved agave, is a member of the subfamily Agavoideae.

Description
It is similar in form to many other agaves. The rosettes are suckering.

The glaucous bluish-green leaves are mostly reflexed and rough (like sand-paper).

Distribution
It is native to the Chihuahuan Desert and surrounding regions, in northeastern Mexico and Texas.

References

scabra
Flora of Northeastern Mexico
Flora of Tamaulipas
Flora of Texas
Flora of the Rio Grande valleys
Flora of the Chihuahuan Desert
Plants described in 1797